This is a list of the NCAA indoor champions in a long sprint event or short middle distance depending on the source's opinion.  Generally that was the 600 yard run until 1983, and the 500 meters being contested 1984-87.  The 1986 and 1987 races are reported to be on a short track.  While both races, won by Roddie Haley are more than a second faster than two previous races, it is unclear if that is because the race was short or the track was less than 200 meters.  Hand timing was used until 1975 and in 1980, starting in 1976 fully automatic timing was used.

Champions
Key
y=yards
w=wind aided
A=Altitude assisted

600 Yards

500 Meters

References

GBR Athletics

External links
NCAA Division I men's indoor track and field

NCAA Men's Division I Indoor Track and Field Championships
Sprint (running)